Samuel Gellibrand (1614–1675) was a London bookseller active in the seventeenth century.

He was the son of the physician Henry Gellibrand (1568–1615) and Mary Faversham. He had four brothers: Henry, John, Edward, and Thomas. Henry Gellibrand, his brother, was a mathematician who was appointed Gresham Professor of Astronomy.

Samuel was apprenticed to Henry Featherstone from 1630 to 1637. He set up business at the sign of the Brazen Serpent, St. Paul's Churchyard, London.

Notable books published by Samuel Gellibrand
Mathematical Magick

References

English booksellers
1614 births
1675 deaths